Teet Helm (born 8 December 1959 in Võru Parish) is an Estonian politician. He was a member of IX Riigikogu.

From 2005 until 2016, he was the mayor of Räpina and has been the mayor of Võnnu.

References

Living people
1949 births
Estonian Reform Party politicians
Members of the Riigikogu, 1999–2003
Mayors of places in Estonia
Tallinn University of Technology alumni
People from Võru Parish